"When Your Lover Has Gone" is a 1931 composition by Einar Aaron Swan which, after being featured in the James Cagney film Blonde Crazy that same year, has become a jazz standard.

Recordings

See also
List of 1930s jazz standards

References 

1931 songs
1930s jazz standards
Songs written by Einar Aaron Swan
Carmen McRae songs
Andy Williams songs
Torch songs